Pongi Ezhu Manohara is a 2015 Indian Tamil-language romantic drama film directed by Ramesh Rangasamy and starring Irfan, Archana, newcomer Arundhati Nair and Singampuli.

Plot synopsis
Manohara, a young man who is a milk vendor, faces various struggles in life after a series of events nearly ruin his family. His life further changes when he discovers about a secret.

Cast 
Irfan as Manohara
Archana as Thenmozhi 
Arundhati Nair as Anandi
Singampuli as Mani
Sampath Ram as Manohara's father

Release and reception 
The film's release was initially scheduled to release on 12 December 2014 postponed to 30 January 2015 and eventually released in February.

Malini Mannath of The New Indian Express opined that "It's a lacklustre screenplay and an insipid narration. At times it gives one the feeling of watching a mediocre TV serial, that which never seemed to end. It is low-down comedy, a noisy affair lacking finesse". A critic from Dinamalar criticised Ramesh Rangasamy's direction. Vandhana of Silverscreen India wrote that "Pongi Ezhu Manohara could have been an impactful film. Instead, it is an example of how a movie, especially one based on real life, and with so much potential for drama, can become a half-baked mess". A critic from Nettv4u stated that "Ponge Ezhi Manohara… Irfan fans get a good treat!"

References